The dense hydrobe, scientific name Aphaostracon pycnus, is a species of small freshwater snails with a gill and an operculum,  aquatic gastropod mollusks in the family Cochliopidae.

Distribution
This species is endemic to the United States.

References

 Hershler R. & Thompson F.G. (1992) A review of the aquatic gastropod subfamily Cochliopinae (Prosobranchia: Hydrobiidae). Malacological Review suppl. 5: 1-140.

Molluscs of the United States
Aphaostracon
Gastropods described in 1968
Taxonomy articles created by Polbot